Uganda  competed at the inaugural African Beach Games in Sal, Cape Verde from 14 to 23 June 2019. In total, athletes representing Uganda won one gold medal and one bronze medal. The country finished in 8th place in the medal table.

Medal summary

Medalists

References 

Nations at the 2019 African Beach Games
African Beach Games